Carreglwyd is a Georgian country house, northwest of Llanfaethlu, Anglesey, Wales, which became a Grade II* listed building in 1952. Its gardens and parkland are listed as Grade II* on the Cadw/ICOMOS Register of Parks and Gardens of Special Historic Interest in Wales.

The earliest mention of the estate is in 1544, when William Griffiths, the Rector of Llanfaethlu, whose ancestors were the Griffiths family of Penrhyn, bought a house named "Ty'n y Pant". His grandson, the Chancellor William Griffiths, oversaw the building of a new house on the site in 1634. Another William Griffiths, the Chancellor's grandson, made further alterations in the late 17th century and early 18th century, the oldest of which remains in the southwest side of the house. The fine hall of the house dates to this period. During the ownership of Holland Griffiths (1756-1839) in the late 18th and early 19th century, further remodelling of the estate was conducted, during which time the dining room, sitting room and library were given a major renovation. The interior was updated in the 1980s.

References

Country houses in Anglesey
Grade II* listed houses
Grade II* listed buildings in Anglesey
Registered historic parks and gardens in Anglesey
Georgian architecture in Wales